Rauer may refer to:
 10025 Rauer, a main-belt asteroid, named after Heike Rauer (born 1961) 
 Rauer Islands, a group of islands located in Prydz Bay, Antarctica

People 
 Evi Rauer (1915–2004), an Estonian actress
 Georg Rauer (1880–1935), an Austrian violin maker
 Rudolf Rauer (1950–2014), a German handball player
 Stephanie Rauer (born 1979), a German ice dancer
 Thomas Rauer (born 1977), a German ice dancer

See also
 Rawer (disambiguation)